XYZ Entertainments, also known as XYZ Entertainment and XYZ (for short), is a Zambian record label based in Lusaka. It was founded by Mwila "Slapdee" Musonda. The entertainment group specializes in R&B and hip hop music. "XYZ" stands for Example yapa Zambia, which is literally "Example of Zambia" in Bemba and Nyanja.

Robert "Bobby East" Chunga is the label's CEO and the production manager was Harry "DJ H-Mac" Mwanza(who is now the Founder of a new record label Called "New age Entertainment").

Notable artists signed to XYZ include Brawen[former member of xyz,now signed to new Age entertainment], founder Slapdee, Bobby East, Kags, Mr. Starsh, Mubby Roux, Koby[former member of xyz,now signed to new Age entertainment], B-Mak[former member of xyz,now signed to new Age entertainment], and singer Jorzi[former member of xyz,now signed to new Age entertainment].

At the 2017 Kwacha Music Awards (KMA), Slapdee won three awards, including Best Male Artist, Best Hip Hop Song (for "Vagwada") and Best Collaboration (Afunika featuring Slapdee, for "Umwaume Wakulela"). He also received Best Male Artist the second time and additional multiple awards for "For a Long Time" at the 2018 KMAs: Best Hip Hop Song; Best Collaboration (with labelmate Bobby East) and Song of the Year. Additionally, Mr. Starsh also won Best Sound Production.

In 2020, one of the label's artists, Daev Zambia, died in a car accident on Chirundu-Kafue Road. His death deeply affected the XYZ team and the Zambian music industry at large. Hundreds of mourners attended his funeral, including fellow Zambian music artists Macky 2, Y Celeb, Roberto Zambia, Chef 187, Ray Dee, and Kekero. He was a prominent figure in helping the spread and growth of Zambian music.

Feud with Macky 2
In the early 2000s, the label's founder and owner was involved in a feud with the then-upcoming fellow rapper from Copperbelt, Macky 2, who owned Kopala Swag and Alpha Entertainment Music. Regarded as one of the largest hip-hop rivalries in the Zambian music industry, it is often compared to the feud between The Notorious B.I.G. and 2Pac.

Macky 2 states the feud took Zambian hip-hop to another level and gave him a larger audience after receiving a lot of attention from fans.

See also
Penzaboy Management

References

Companies based in Lusaka
Mass media in Zambia
Music organisations based in Zambia